The 2019 Monte Carlo Formula 2 round was a pair of motor races for Formula 2 cars that took place on 24 and 25 May 2019 at the Circuit de Monaco in Monte-Carlo, Monaco as part of the FIA Formula 2 Championship. It was the fourth round of the 2019 FIA Formula 2 Championship and was run in support of the 2019 Monaco Grand Prix.

Background

Driver changes
Artem Markelov made a one-off return as a replacement for Jordan King at MP Motorsport, who was competing in the 2019 Indianapolis 500 with Rahal Letterman Lanigan Racing.

Classification

Qualifying

Group A

Group B

Notes
 – Nicholas Latifi was given a three-place grid penalty for exiting the pit lane whilst the pit exit light was red.

Feature race

The race has been red-flagged midway-through on lap 20 after a collision between Mick Schumacher and Tatiana Calderón on Rascasse. As a result, everyone down between Calderón in ninth and Raghunathan in nineteenth was stuck behind the incident. That bizzarely meant that the entire top eight gained a lap on the rest of the field, although they would all have to serve their mandatory stop after the race restarted.

Notes
 – Ralph Boschung was given a ten-second time penalty for leaving the track and gaining an advantage.
 – Mick Schumacher was given a five-second time penalty for leaving the track and gaining an advantage.
 – Mahaveer Raghunathan was given a five-second time penalty for leaving the track and gaining an advantage as well as a twenty-second time penalty for causing an avoidable collision with Jack Aitken.
 – Luca Ghiotto originally finished 2nd but was disqualified for his car using rack stops of a thickness that did not comply with the sporting regulations.

Sprint race

Notes
 – Sean Gelael set the fastest lap, but finished outside the top 10, so he was ineligible to score points for the fastest lap. The two bonus points for the fastest lap were awarded to Nicholas Latifi as he set the fastest lap of those who finished inside the top 10 with a time of 1:23.868.

Championship standings after the round

Drivers' Championship standings

Teams' Championship standings

References

External links 
 

Monaco
Formula 2
Formula 2